Linda Foster (born June 12, 1944) is an English-American film and television actress. She is known for playing Doris Royal in the American television sitcom Hank.

Life and career 
Foster was born in Lancaster, Lancashire, the daughter of Nicholas, a marine engineer, and Hilda, who ran a dance studio. At the age of six, she learned ballet and modern dance. Foster and her family later moved to Toronto, Ontario, in 1957. She then settled in Los Angeles, California. Foster graduated high school in Van Nuys, California, and studied to become a secretary. She began her screen career in 1963, appearing in an episode of the television sitcom My Three Sons.

In 1965, Foster joined the cast of the new NBC sitcom television series Hank, starring as Doris Royal, the girlfriend of the title character.

After the series ended in 1966, Foster guest-starred in television programs including Gunsmoke, The Man from U.N.C.L.E., F Troop, Bonanza, Tom, Dick, and Mary, McHale's Navy, The Virginian, and Rango. In her film career, she appeared in Honeymoon Hotel, The Ambushers, Marriage on the Rocks, John Goldfarb, Please Come Home!, and Young Fury. While appearing on the anthology television series Bob Hope Presents the Chrysler Theatre, she had a contract with Universal Pictures, keeping her busy on the television series with separate roles on two episodes. Foster retired in 1983, last appearing in the soap opera television series Dynasty as a journalist in the episode "Tender Comrades".

References

External links 

Rotten Tomatoes profile

1944 births
Living people
People from Lancaster, Lancashire
Actresses from Lancashire
English emigrants to Canada
English emigrants to the United States
American film actresses
American television actresses
English film actresses
English television actresses
20th-century American actresses
20th-century English actresses
20th-century American ballet dancers
20th-century British ballet dancers
21st-century American actresses